Brendan is an Irish masculine given name in the English language. It is derived from the Gaelic name Breandán, which is in turn derived from the earlier Old Irish Brénainn. The Old Welsh breenhin is the root of the name, meaning prince or king. The mediaeval Latin form of the name, Brendanus, has also influenced the modern English and Irish forms. Variant spellings are Brendon and Brenden. In some cases it is possible that the given name Brandon is also a variant of Brendan. A variant spelling of the Irish Breandán is Breanndán.

Etymology
The English Brendan is an Anglicised form of the Irish Breandán, in turn derived from the Old Irish Brénainn. This Old Irish personal name (pronounced [br'ēn-in']) is derived from a borrowing of the Welsh language word breenhín, meaning "a prince". Both the English form and the modern Irish form, Breandán, are based upon the mediaeval Latin form Brendanus. According to one old Irish text there are 17 saints with the name. When used in an Irish sentence it can take the form Bhreandán e.g. A Bhreandán or ..do Bhreandán. Variations of the Irish Breandán are Breanndán, Bhreandán and Bhreandáin.

There is no etymological link between Brendan and Brenda. This feminine given name, pronounced , is thought to be derived from the Old Norse element brand, meaning "(flaming) sword". In most cases, the masculine given name Brandon, pronounced , is considered to be derived from the surname Brandon, which is in turn derived from two Old English elements.

Variants, cognates
English – Brandon (in some cases), Brendon
Irish – Breandán, Breanndán
Latin – Brendanus
Old Irish – Brénainn

Popularity and use
In some cases, the masculine given name Brennan may be used as a contracted form of Brendan, although it is etymologically unrelated. It is derived from the surname Brennan, an Anglicised form of the Irish Ó Braonáin. The popularity of (forms of) Brendan in Gaelic-speaking countries is thought to have influenced the use and popularity of the etymologically unrelated feminine name Brenda.

In 2008, the name was not in the top 100 given names for babies in the United States. However, it ranked within the top 100 given names for babies in New England with 2.60 occurrences per 1,000. During the decades spanning 1900–1940 the name wasn't among the top 1,000 given names recorded for babies in the United States. However, in the 1950s it ranked 679; in the 1960s 448; in the 1970s 293; in the 1980s 190; and in the 1990s 133. In recent years in the United States, the name has fallen in the ranking of names for babies. In 2000 it ranked 101; in 2001 115; in 2002 124; in 2003 141; in 2004 149; in 2005 175; in 2006 185; in 2007 205; and in 2008 207.

People named Brendan 
 Saint Brendan of Clonfert (c. 484 - c. 577), Irish monastic saint
 Saint Brendan of Birr (died 573), Abbot of Birr in Co. Offaly, contemporaneous with the above
 Brendan Allen (born 1995), American mixed martial artist
 Brendan Behan (1923–1964), Irish writer
 Brendan Benson (born 1970), Detroit-area musician
 Brendan Bracken (1901-1958), a British cabinet member
 Brendan Byrne (1924–2018), American Democratic Party politician from New Jersey
 Brendan Cowell (born 1976), Australian actor and screenwriter
 Brendan Coyle (born 1963), British actor
 Brendan Donnelly (born 1971), baseball player
 Brendan Evans (born 1986), American tennis player
 Brendan Eich (born 1961), American creator of the JavaScript programming language and co-founder of Mozilla
 Brendan Fevola (born 1981), Australian footballer 
 Brendan Fraser (born 1968), Canadian-American actor
 Brendan Foster (born 1948), British long distance runner 
 Brendan Gallagher (b. 1992), Canadian hockey player
 Brendan Garard (born 1971), Australian hockey player
 Brendan Gleeson (born 1955), Irish actor
 Brendan Grace (1951–2019), Irish comedian and singer
 Brendan Greene (born 1976), Irish video game developer
 Brendan Hansen (born 1981), American swimmer
 Brendan Harris (born 1980), American baseball player
 Brendan Haywood (born 1979), American basketball player
 Brendan Hines (born 1976), American actor and musician
 Brendan Horgan, American businessman
 Brendan Howlin (born 1956), Irish Labour Party politician
 Brendan Lane (basketball) (born 1990), American basketball player
 Brendan Langley (born 1994), American football player
 Brendan Leipsic (born 1994), Canadian hockey player
Angus Brendan MacNeil (born 1970) Scottish politician, MP for Na h-Eileanan an Iar
 Brendan Mahon (born 1995), American football player
 Brendan Malone (b. 1942), American basketball coach
 Brendan Murray (born 1996), Irish singer
 Brendan Murray (born 1995), American record producer known as Bighead
 Brendan Morrison (born 1975), Canadian hockey player
 Brendan Nelson (born 1958), Australian politician
 Brendan O'Neill (disambiguation), several people
 Brendan Rodgers (born 1973), football manager
 Brendan Ryan (disambiguation), several people
 Brendan Shanahan (born 1969), hockey player
 Brendan Simbwaye (1934–1972?), Namibian anti-apartheid activist who disappeared in 1972
 Brendon Small (born 1975), American writer, creator of the TV shows Home Movies and Metalocalypse
 Brendan Smith (disambiguation), several people
 Brendan Smyth (1927–1997), Irish Roman Catholic priest.                                                             
 Brendan Walsh (born 1959), American chef
 Brendon Walsh (born 1978), American stand-up comedian
 Brendan White (born 1992), Australian association football player
 Brendan Whitecross (born 1990), Australian footballer

Fictional characters named Brendan 
Brendan Frye, lead character in the movie Brick
Brendan Jones, from Australian television program A Country Practice
Brendan (Pokémon), the main male character of Pokémon Ruby, Sapphire, Emerald, Omega Ruby and Alpha Sapphire
Brendan Brady, from Channel 4 soap opera Hollyoaks
Brendan, supporting character in the film The Darjeeling Limited
Brendan Richards, from the short-lived Doctor Who spinoff K-9 and Company
Brendan, the main character of the animated fantasy movie The Secret of Kells
Brendan Conlon, one of the lead characters in the 2011 movie Warrior, played by Joel Edgerton

People named Breandán 
 Breandán Breathnach (1912–1985), Irish music collector and Uilleann piper
 Breandán de Gallaí (born 1969), Irish professional dancer
 Breandán Ó hEithir (1930–1990), Irish writer and broadcaster
 Breandán Ó Madagain (1932–2020), Irish scholar, writer and celticist

See also
List of Irish-language given names

Notes

References

English-language masculine given names
Irish masculine given names

ja:ブレンダン
pt:Brendan